State Route 254 (SR 254) is a  east–west state route in northern Ohio. The route begins at State Route 57 in Lorain and ends at U.S. Route 20 in Lakewood. SR 254 intersects Interstate 90 twice, both times near its endpoints. State Route 254 is known as Detroit Road for most of its routing, and as North Ridge Road at its western end.

The route has a signed eastern terminus at the intersection of Detroit Road and Wooster Road, which is also the signed terminus of SR 113 and where a brief concurrency with US 20 and Alternate US 6 begins. The designated route continues via an unsigned concurrency with SR 2 from the Marion Ramp in Rocky River rejoining of US 6. From there, it continues on Clifton Boulevard before ending at the intersection of Clifton and West Clifton Boulevards (the terminus of SR 237 and the unsigned terminus of SR 113), where US 20 joins US 6 and SR 2 for a triple concurrency on Clifton Boulevard through Lakewood.

The signed portion of State Route 254 on Detroit Road from the Marion Ramp to the intersection of Detroit Road and Wooster Road is officially known as State Route 254-D. SR 254-D also briefly travels north on West Lake Road (US 6 Alternate) unsigned before terminating at Old Detroit Road.

Major intersections

SR 254

SR 254-D

References

254
Lorain, Ohio
Transportation in Lorain County, Ohio
Transportation in Cuyahoga County, Ohio